Cristian Darío Álvarez Azad (born 13 November 1985) is an Argentine professional footballer who plays for Spanish club Real Zaragoza as a goalkeeper.

Club career

Rosario Central
Born in General Lagos, Santa Fe Province, Álvarez came through the youth ranks at hometown club Rosario Central, making his first-team debut in a Copa Libertadores game against Paraguayan side Cerro Porteño on 23 February 2006, a 0–2 home defeat. He went on to fully establish himself as first choice, playing two seasons in the Primera División.

Espanyol
In late May 2008, Álvarez joined Spanish team RCD Espanyol, signing a five-year contract. He spent most of his spell with the Catalans restricted to Copa del Rey matches, being barred in La Liga by Cameroonian Carlos Kameni; his longest run in the latter competition came during the 2009–10 season as the starter had been selected to the 2010 Africa Cup of Nations and he made four appearances, conceding as many goals in two wins, one draw and one loss.

Álvarez was promoted to first choice for the start of the 2011–12 campaign by manager Mauricio Pochettino, with Kameni also still in the roster.

San Lorenzo
On 7 July 2013, Álvarez joined San Lorenzo de Almagro on a three-year deal. Initially a starter, he suffered an injury and eventually lost his place to Sebastián Torrico, contributing only three games as his team won the Torneo Inicial.

Álvarez was also an unused substitute in the club's victorious run in the 2014 Copa Libertadores. He returned to Spain and its top division for 2014–15, being loaned to Rayo Vallecano.

In August 2015, still owned by San Lorenzo, Álvarez moved to Cerro Porteño of the Paraguayan Primera División.

Zaragoza
On 3 August 2017, Álvarez agreed to a one-year contract at Real Zaragoza, with an option to extend for two more years. The following February, after playing a required number of games, this was made effective.

Álvarez put pen to paper to a further extension on 20 August 2020, until 2023. On 30 April 2021, he headed home from a free kick in the 97th minute of the 2–2 Segunda División away draw with CD Lugo.

Honours
San Lorenzo
Argentine Primera División: 2013 Inicial
Copa Libertadores: 2014

References

External links

Argentine League statistics 

1985 births
Living people
People from Rosario Department
Argentine sportspeople of Spanish descent
Sportspeople from Santa Fe Province
Argentine footballers
Association football goalkeepers
Argentine Primera División players
Rosario Central footballers
San Lorenzo de Almagro footballers
La Liga players
Segunda División players
RCD Espanyol footballers
Rayo Vallecano players
Real Zaragoza players
Paraguayan Primera División players
Cerro Porteño players
Argentine expatriate footballers
Expatriate footballers in Spain
Expatriate footballers in Paraguay
Argentine expatriate sportspeople in Spain
Argentine expatriate sportspeople in Paraguay